The 1998 Bavarian state election was held on 13 September 1998 to elect the members of the 14th Landtag of Bavaria. The Christian Social Union (CSU) led by Minister-President Edmund Stoiber retained its majority with minor gains, while the opposition took minor losses. The largest change in the election was the rise in popularity of the Free Voters of Bavaria, who won 3.7% of the vote, but failed to win any seats.

Parties
The table below lists parties represented in the 13th Landtag of Bavaria.

Opinion polling

Election result

|-
! colspan="2" | Party
! Votes
! %
! +/-
! Seats 
! +/-
! Seats %
|-
| bgcolor=| 
| align=left | Christian Social Union (CSU)
| align=right| 6,447,764
| align=right| 52.9
| align=right| 0.8
| align=right| 123
| align=right| 3
| align=right| 60.3
|-
| bgcolor=| 
| align=left | Social Democratic Party (SPD)
| align=right| 3,501,900
| align=right| 28.7
| align=right| 1.3
| align=right| 67
| align=right| 3
| align=right| 32.8
|-
| bgcolor=| 
| align=left | Alliance 90/The Greens (Grüne)
| align=right| 692,456
| align=right| 5.7
| align=right| 0.4
| align=right| 14
| align=right| ±0
| align=right| 6.9
|-
! colspan=8|
|-
| bgcolor=#007E82| 
| align=left | Free Voters of Bavaria (FW)
| align=right| 446,115
| align=right| 3.7
| align=right| 3.6
| align=right| 0
| align=right| ±0
| align=right| 0
|-
| bgcolor=| 
| align=left | The Republicans (REP)
| align=right| 438,144
| align=right| 3.6
| align=right| 0.3
| align=right| 0
| align=right| ±0
| align=right| 0
|-
| bgcolor=| 
| align=left | Ecological Democratic Party (ÖDP)
| align=right| 217,840
| align=right| 1.8
| align=right| 0.3
| align=right| 0
| align=right| ±0
| align=right| 0
|-
| bgcolor=| 
| align=left | Free Democratic Party (FDP)
| align=right| 201,788
| align=right| 1.7
| align=right| 1.1
| align=right| 0
| align=right| ±0
| align=right| 0
|-
| 
| align=left | Others
| align=right| 240,902
| align=right| 1.9
| align=right| 0.4
| align=right| 0
| align=right| ±0
| align=right| 0
|-
! align=right colspan=2| Total
! align=right| 12,186,909
! align=right| 100.0
! align=right| 
! align=right| 204
! align=right| ±0
! align=right| 
|-
! align=right colspan=2| Voter turnout
! align=right| 
! align=right| 69.8
! align=right| 2.0
! align=right| 
! align=right| 
! align=right| 
|}

Notes

Sources
 The Federal Returning Officer

Bavaria
1998
1998 in Bavaria
September 1998 events in Europe